The Reformed Druids of North America (RDNA) is an American Neo-Druidic organization. It was formed in 1963 at Carleton College, Northfield, Minnesota as a humorous protest against the college's required attendance of religious services. This original congregation is called the Carleton Grove, sometimes the Mother Grove. There are over 40 groves and proto-groves of the RDNA throughout the United States and Canada.

History

Origins
A liberal arts college, Carleton had been founded by the Congregational Church, but by the 1960s had become a non-denominational institution. Nonetheless, the student handbook still held that "attendance is required at the College Service of Worship or at the Sunday Evening Program or at any regularly organized service of public worship." A number of students, including David Fisher, David Frangquist, Howard Cherniack, Jan Johnson and Norman Nelson thought this rule unnecessary, and formed their own religious group in protest rather than attend any of the extant ones. They thus created the RDNA, holding meetings near the college athletic fields, and marking the obligatory "chapel slips" correspondingly. As Nelson would later explain, "The sole motive was to protest the requirement, not to try for alternatives for worship… There was never any intention to mock any religion; it was not intended that RDNA should compete with or supplant any faith. We tried to write a service which could be attended 'in good faith' by anyone."

The RDNA believed that pain of hypocrisy would force the college authorities to validate their activities as public worship. Instead, the dean of men ignored the group, neither accepting the chapel slips nor disciplining the members. But the dean of women chose to accept the slips that the RDNA's two female members submitted. After extended discussion with the Druids, the college recognized its untenable position, and dropped the religious requirement in June, 1964. The college's President Nason and his wife attended the final RDNA ceremony that academic year, overlooking a ritual consumption of whiskey that technically violated college rules.

But in challenging the college's chapel requirement, the founders had unwittingly fostered a rewarding environment for spiritual exploration. Many Druids had come to value the movement in their lives, and the founders were stunned to discover that demand for Druid services continued even after the college requirement disappeared.

Principles
Reformed Druidism emphasizes its lack of institutionalized dogma. Each Druid is required only to adopt these basic tenets:
 One of the many ways in which the object of Man's search for religious truth can be found is through Nature.
 Nature, being one of the primary concerns in Man's life and struggle, and being one of the objects of Creation, is important to Man's spiritual quests.

The original group were not Neo-Pagan – most identified themselves as Jewish, Christian, agnostic, atheist, or as members of other faiths – and the movement still includes many who do not consider themselves Neo-Pagan.

Chas S. Clifton, an academic scholar of Neopaganism, made several suggestions as to where the early RDNA founders may have got their ideas about Druidry from, noting that there were British Druid groups such as the Ancient Druid Order operating at the time, who held annual ceremonies at the megalithic monument of Stonehenge in Wiltshire, attracting much media attention. Accompanying this, there were ideas about the ancient druids to be found in the "American literary consciousness", where they appeared as guardians of the natural world in the Romanticist poetry of Philip Freneau.

Clifton's speculations are in contrast to the actual motivations for Reformed Druidism. In fact,  at a meeting in Fisher's dormitory room about the religious requirement, Cherniack volunteered that his family had always responded to questions about religion by claiming to be Druids, and the group adopted this moniker.  When someone pointed out that none of the group knew anything at all about Druids, the suggestion quickly arose that the new group call itself The Reformed Druids of North America, so it could create tenets and rituals out of whole cloth without having to know or care anything about any previous Druids.

Ritual
In accord with the Basic Tenets, Reformed Druid worship is directed toward Nature. Services involve gathering in a wooded place periodically (the original group met weekly during warm weather) and on the festival days of Northern European Pagan tradition.  Services typically include:
 The singing of religious songs.
 The performance of ceremonial chanting.
 Prayers and meditations.
The written liturgy calls for a "sacrifice of life".  An early disagreement, recounted in The Druid Chronicles, was resolved by limiting the sacrifice to plant life, whence the term "Reformed" was adopted as part of the group's name.

Literature
While Reformed Druids are considered the least organized and most playful Druids, their literature is perhaps the more extensively produced and archived of any modern Druid group in America. It is estimated that it would take 100 full days to read through the 7000 pages of the whole genre. Despite the sheer volume,  it is quite possible and common for prominent members to participate actively in a Grove or a conference for years without having read more than a few dozen pages, as the oral and living traditions are also quite vital and nuanced.

The written traditions were mostly composed by members of the Third Order priesthood, but the writers do not claim divine inspiration.  An understanding or agreement with the written material is generally not required for any office or ordination, but is more commonly browsed by members entering the second or higher orders, or when assuming office responsibilities in a Grove.

The literature is notably non-dogmatic, eclectic, leaning towards philosophic rather than magic in focus, and often written "tongue-in-cheek", with authors tending to poke fun at themselves.  Reformed Druidic literature has been an almost entirely open literature, unlike many fraternal or mystical Druid organizations that restrict material to initiates. Most earlier publications were limited in distribution, primarily by the cost of publication in the 1960s and 1970s, but available upon request.

While generally well-researched and crafted, Reformed Druidic materials are not intended as serious academic works, and are intended for its own audience.  Except of a few pamphlets, these materials have not been used for proselytizing.  Despite the Reformed Druids' lack of missionary impulse, many of the literary traits from Reformed Druidism were transferred to later groups that trace their origins to the RDNA. This is due in large part to the influence of Isaac Bonewits' fervent missionary and publishing efforts in newsletters, member guides, seminary materials and popular books from 1971 to 2010.

The literature of the major works have various distinct genres, including; the writing of epistles, drafting liturgies, collecting materials for meditative use, historiography, calendar and protocol guides, research tracts on modern and ancient Druidry, council records, oral histories, local event chronographies, teaching guides for new members, recruitment materials, terminology references, bardic material collections, and even game design.

In addition to the major printed collections that have grown exponentially larger every decade, several newsletters and magazines have been published, websites and talk groups have held online since the early 1990s. In other media, members of the Reform has produced full-length movies, albums, and an animated series.

Members of the Reformed Druid priesthood (such as Isaac Bonewits and more recently, John Michael Greer) have published short stories, novels, several books on religion, including modern Druidism, even though those works are not directly related to Reformed Druidism.

Major works
 1964 The Druid Chronicles (Reformed)
 1976 The Druid Chronicles (Evolved) (first edition)
 1982 Druid Compendium (project aborted when ADF founded)
 1996 A Reformed Druid Anthology
 2004 The Carleton Druid Collection
 2004 The Druid Chronicles (Evolved), third edition
 2004 A Reformed Druid Anthology 2 (Main Volume)
 2005 A Reformed Druid Anthology 2 (Green Books Volume)
 2005 A Reformed Druid Anthology 2 (Magazines Volume).
 2009 Unofficial Welcome Pamphlet (first edition)
 2010 The Druid's Path (first edition)

Minor works
 1966 Black Book of Liturgy
 1966 Green Book of Meditations (first edition)
 1974 Green Book of Meditations (second edition)
 1994 Orange Book of Apocrypha

Newsletters
 1977–1981 The Druid Chronicler
 1978–1981 The Pentalpha Journal
 1982–1991 A Druid Missal-Any
 1994 News from the Hill of Three Oaks
 1994 The Standing Stone
 2000–2008 A Druid Missal-Any
 2003–2012 The Druid's Egg
 2008–Present The Druid Inquirer

Movies
 1995 Gatorr: The Fighting Rabbit
 2011–2012 Desperate Druids, a webseries

References
Footnotes

Bibliography

 
 
 
 

 Reformed Druid Anthology: Chronicles of the Foundation
 Reformed Druid Anthology: Books of the Apocrypha
 Reformed Druid Anthology: Books of the Liturgy

External links
 Reformed Druids of North America – unofficial central website

Modern pagan organizations based in the United States
Neo-druidism
Religious organizations established in 1963
Religious belief systems founded in the United States
Modern pagan organizations established in the 1960s